The lieutenant governor of Alaska is the deputy elected official to the governor of the U.S. state of Alaska. Unlike most lieutenant governors in the U.S., the office also maintains the duties of a secretary of state, and indeed was named such until August 25, 1970. Prior to statehood, the territorial-era Secretary of Alaska, who was appointed by the president of the United States like the governor, functioned as an acting governor or successor-in-waiting. Currently, the lieutenant governor accedes to the governorship in case of a vacancy. The lieutenant governor runs together with the governor in both the primary and the general election as a slate.

Notes

References
Constitution

 

Specific

External links
 Office of the Lieutenant Governor of Alaska

 
Lieutenant governor
Alaska
1959 establishments in Alaska